Napat Tapketkaew (born June 29, 1982) is a retired professional footballer from Thailand.

Honours

Club
Buriram PEA
 Thai Premier League Champions (1) : 2011
 Thai FA Cup winner (1) : 2011
 Thai League Cup winner (1) : 2011

Thai Honda
 Regional League Bangkok Area Division Champions (1) : 2014

External links
 Goal.com 
 

1982 births
Living people
Napat Tapketkaew
Napat Tapketkaew
Association football defenders
Napat Tapketkaew
Napat Tapketkaew
Napat Tapketkaew
Napat Tapketkaew
Napat Tapketkaew
Napat Tapketkaew
Napat Tapketkaew